Venezuela competed at the 1992 Summer Olympics in Barcelona, Spain. 26 competitors, 22 men and 4 women, took part in 16 events in 8 sports.

Competitors
The following is the list of number of competitors in the Games.

Basketball

Men's Team Competition

Classification Round 9-12th place

11th place game

Roster
 ( 4.) Víctor David Díaz
 ( 5.) David Díaz
 ( 6.) Melquiades Jaramillo
 ( 7.) Nelson Solórzano
 ( 8.) Rostin González
 ( 9.) Luis Jiménez
 (10.) Sam Shepherd
 (11.) Carl Herrera
 (12.) Omar Walcott
 (13.) Gabriel Estaba
 (14.) Iván Olivares
 (15.) Alexander Nelcha

Boxing

Cycling

Four cyclists, three men and one woman, represented Venezuela in 1992.

Men's road race
 Carlos Maya
 Hussein Monsalve
 Robinson Merchán

Women's sprint
 Daniela Larreal

Diving

Men's 3m Springboard
Dario Di Fazio
 Preliminary Round — 332.43 points (→ did not advance, 25th place)

Men's 10m Platform
Dario Di Fazio
 Preliminary Round — 317.04 (→ did not advance, 23rd place)

Judo

Women's Half-Middleweight
 Xiomara Griffith
 Final — 7th place

Women's Extra-Lightweight
 María Villapol
 Final — 7th place

Men's Extra-Lightweight
 Willis García
 Final — 7th place

Synchronized swimming

One synchronized swimmer represented Venezuela in 1992.

Women's solo
 María Elena Giusti
 Final — 9th place

Weightlifting

Men's Flyweight
Humberto Fuentes

Men's Lightweight
José Medina

Men's Light-Heavyweight
Julio César Luña

Wrestling

See also
 Venezuela at the 1991 Pan American Games

References

External links
Official Olympic Reports

Nations at the 1992 Summer Olympics
1992
Summer Olympics